Psychological astrology, or astropsychology, is the result of the cross-fertilisation of the fields of astrology with depth psychology, humanistic psychology and transpersonal psychology. There are several methods of analyzing the horoscope in the contemporary psychological astrology: the horoscope can be analysed through the archetypes within astrology (as is characteristic for Jungian approach in astrology) or the analyses can be rooted in the psychological need and motivational theories. There might exist other astrological methods and approaches rooted in psychology. Astrologer and psychotherapist Glenn Perry characterises psychological astrology as "both a personality theory and a diagnostic tool".

No methodologically sound scientific studies exist that show a benefit or detriment in using psychological astrology. Psychological astrology, or astropsychology is a pseudoscience.

Origins
In the twentieth century, the western esoteric tradition inspired the Swiss psychiatrist and founder of analytical psychology, Carl Jung to formulate his archetypal hypothesis, influenced by Plato's  theory of ideas or forms. In his research into the symbolic meaning of his patient's dreams, conversations and paintings, Jung observed recurring mythical themes or archetypes. He proposed that these universal and timeless archetypes channel experiences and emotions, resulting in recognizable and typical patterns of behavior with certain probable outcomes.  Jung claimed to observe a correlation between these archetypal images and the astrological themes or traditional 'gods' associated with the planets and signs of the zodiac. He concluded that the symbolic heavenly figures described by the constellations were originally inspired by projections of images created by the collective unconscious. Jung wrote "Astrology represents the sum of all the psychological knowledge of antiquity".

In collaboration with pioneer theoretical physicist (and Nobel laureate) Wolfgang Pauli, Jung developed the theory of synchronicity.   This theory, which Jung compared to Aristotle's formal causation, poses that "whatever is born or done at this particular moment of time, has the quality of this moment of time".  Accordingly, astrological claims of correlations between the position of heavenly bodies at the time of birth and an individual's development were defined by Jung as being acausal and not directly caused by the planets.

Jungian legacy
Several astrologers as well as psychologists pursued Jung's theories in their writings, teachings and practice. One of the first astrologers to combine Jungian psychology with astrology was Dane Rudhyar and his protégé, Alexander Ruperti. Rudhyar termed it "humanistic astrology," the subject of his monumental volume, The Astrology of Personality, published in 1936.  Psychological astrology, however became firmly established in the late 20th century with the books and lectures of Liz Greene and Stephen Arroyo who were both strongly influenced by the Jungian model.  In 1983, Liz Greene and Howard Sasportas, a psychosynthesis psychotherapist, founded the Centre for Psychological Astrology in London.

Meanwhile, in Switzerland, Bruno and Louise Huber also developed their own method of astrological psychology, referred to as the Huber Method which was influenced by Roberto Assagioli's work with psychosynthesis.  In 1962, the Hubers founded the Huber School of Astrology and their work is now taught at the Astrological Psychology Association.

Possibly the most widespread application of Jung's theories is through the Myers-Briggs Type Indicator (MBTI) assessment developed during the Second World War.  CPP Inc., the publisher of the MBTI instrument, calls it "the world’s most widely used personality assessment", with as many as two million assessments administered annually. This psychometric questionnaire is designed to measure psychological preferences in how people perceive the world and make decisions.  These preferences were extrapolated from the typological theories proposed by Jung and first published in his 1921 book Psychological Types.  So the authors, Briggs and Myers adapted Jung's four psychological types, which were based on the four elements of classical cosmology on which the zodiac, with its corresponding human character traits, was structured.  Nicholas Campion comments that this is "a fascinating example of 'disguised astrology', masquerading as science in order to claim respectability."

Other psychological approaches
Back in the 1970s, in the twelve-volume series, The Principles and Practice of Astrology (Llewellyn 1975), Noel Tyl has allied the psychological need theory with astrological symbolism. This analytical blend is developed fully in his book Holistic Astrology - The Analysis of Inner and Outer Environment  (1980). In the light of the psychological need theory, he interprets the horoscope "as a process of lifelong conditioning, where individuals are predisposed to present individualized needs to the environment. .... This process identifies how we act, who we are, and how we fit into the world. Fulfilling destiny, in modern terms, is fulfilling needs."

Philosophy
While psychological astrology brings a transpersonal dimension and spiritual notions to psychology by linking the psyche to the Cosmos, psychological astrology is "decidedly not deterministic".  Nor is an individual's everyday life ruled by malefic or benefic planets as the horoscope is considered a mere tool to help identify an individual's nature and potential for psycho-spiritual growth.

Criticism
Psychological astrology has been criticized for confirmation bias and astrology is widely considered a pseudoscience by the scientific community.  In psychology and cognitive science, confirmation bias is a tendency to search for or interpret new information in a way that confirms one's preconceptions and avoids information and interpretations that contradict prior beliefs.

Research

The largest and most recognized study of the claims of astrology was published by Shawn Carlson in Nature. Twenty-eight professional astrologers agreed to participate, including several who were strongly influenced by the Jungian model. Carlson concluded that the astrologers were unable to match horoscopes with profiles compiled using the California Psychological Inventory (CPI) in blind tests any better than chance.

See also
 Astrological symbols
 Astrology and alchemy
 Astrology and astronomy
 Astrology and computers
 Planets in astrology
 Season of birth
 Maslow's hierarchy of needs
 Self-actualization

References

External links
The Centre for Psychological Astrology
The Journal of Psychological Astrology
Association for Psychological Astrology
Official website of Noel Tyl
Noel Tyl at Astro Wiki 

 
Astrology by type
Analytical psychology
Western astrology
Carl Jung